Miloš Vučević (born 10 December 1974) is a Serbian lawyer and politician serving as deputy prime minister of Serbia and minister of defence since 2022. A member and vice-president of the Serbian Progressive Party (SNS), he served as mayor of Novi Sad from 2012 to 2022.

Early life, education and law career 
Vučević was born on 10 December 1974 in Novi Sad, SAP Vojvodina, SR Serbia, SFR Yugoslavia. He finished elementary school in Novi Sad and high school in Bački Petrovac. Vučević graduated from the Faculty of Law, University of Novi Sad, in 1999.

He practiced law in the family law office until 2012.

Political career 

Vučević started his political career as a member of the far-right Serbian Radical Party (SRS) where his father was a high-ranking member. SRS split later in 2008, and Vučević joined the breakaway Serbian Progressive Party (SNS) led by Tomislav Nikolić and Aleksandar Vučić. He is a close associate and confidant of President Aleksandar Vučić and his brother Andrej Vučić.

Following the 2012 local elections, Vučević was elected Mayor of Novi Sad by a new SNS-led majority, even though SNS only won 16.44% of the popular vote. He was a member of the board of directors of the National Alliance for Local Economic Development (NALED) from 2015 to 2016. He was re-elected mayor following the 2016 and 2020 local elections.

In November 2021, he was elected vice president of the party at the SNS party assembly.

Deputy Prime Minister and Minister of Defence 
On 23 October 2022, the president of the Serbian Progressive Party Aleksandar Vučić announced that his party would recommend Miloš Vučević as the next deputy prime minister and minister of defence of Serbia. He resigned as the Mayor of the City of Novi Sad on 24 October, and was succeeded by Milan Đurić two days later. Vučević was sworn in as deputy prime minister and minister of defence on 26 October as part of the third cabinet of Ana Brnabić. It has been speculated that Vučević will succeed Vučić as the president of the Serbian Progressive Party following his potential resignation.

Political positions

Foreign policy 
Vučević is in favor of Serbia's accession to the European Union, at the same time claiming that Serbia cannot become its member by "being humiliated and ashamed, because then it will never be a good member of the EU". On 24 March 2019, Vučević stated that the NATO bombing of Yugoslavia was a war crime. He opposes sanctioning Russia due to its 2022 invasion of Ukraine.

Kosovo question 

Vučević is against the recognition of independence of Kosovo, adding that Kosovo is the "state-forming DNA of our people and our country".

Personal life 
Vučević's father Zoran was a lawyer and high-ranking member of SRS who served as the president of the City Assembly of Novi Sad from 2004 to 2007. His father died in 2021. Vučević is married and has two sons.

References

1974 births
Living people
Mayors of Novi Sad
21st-century Serbian lawyers
Members of the National Assembly (Serbia)
Serbian Progressive Party politicians
University of Novi Sad alumni
Serbian Radical Party politicians